John Alan Drake (22 January 1959 – 13 December 2008) was a New Zealand rugby union footballer who represented the All Blacks and Auckland as a tighthead prop.

He played twelve times for New Zealand including eight test matches. He debuted for the All Blacks on the 1985 tour of Argentina playing in the 56–6 thumping of Mar del Plata. Drake was a key member of the 1987 All Black team which won the 1987 Rugby World Cup, playing in five of the six matches including scoring a try in the semi-final victory against Wales and playing in the final against France.

He retired at the end of the 1987 season while only 28 and later became a newspaper columnist and television commentator. Drake was educated at Auckland Grammar School. He died suddenly at his home, aged 49, on 13 December 2008.

References

1959 births
2008 deaths
Rugby union players from Auckland
People educated at Auckland Grammar School
New Zealand rugby union players
New Zealand international rugby union players
Auckland rugby union players
Rugby union props